Cystovirus is a genus of double-stranded RNA viruses which infects bacteria. It is the only genus in the family Cystoviridae. The name of the group cysto derives from Greek kystis which means bladder or sack. There are seven species in this genus.

Discovery 

Pseudomonas virus phi6 was the first virus in this family to be discovered and was initially characterized in 1973 by Anne Vidaver at the University of Nebraska. She found that when she cultured the bacterial strain Pseudomonas phaseolicola HB1OY with halo blight infected bean straw, cytopathic effects were detected in cultured lawns, indicating that there was a lytic microbe or bacteriophage present.

In 1999, phi7–14 were identified by the laboratory of Leonard Mindich at the Public Health Research Institute associated with New York University. They did this by culturing various leaves in Lysogeny Broth and then plating the broth on lawns of Pseudomonas syringae pv phaseolicola. They were able to identify viral plaques from this and then subsequently sequence their genomes.

Microbiology

Structure

Cystovirus particles are enveloped, with icosahedral and spherical geometries, and T=13, T=2 symmetry. The virion diameter is around 85 nm. Cystoviruses are distinguished by their outer layer protein and lipid envelope. No other bacteriophage has any lipid in its outer coat, though the Tectiviridae and the Corticoviridae have lipids within their capsids.

Genome 

Cystoviruses have a tripartite double-stranded RNA genome which is approximately 14 kbp in total length. The genome is linear and segmented, and labeled as large (L) 6.4 kbp, medium (M) 4 kbp, and small (S) 2.9 kb in length. The genome codes for twelve proteins.

Life cycle

Cytoviruses enter the bacteria by adsorption on its pilus and then membrane fusion. Viral replication is cytoplasmic. Replication follows the double-stranded RNA virus replication model. Double-stranded RNA virus transcription is the method of transcription. The progeny viruses are released from the cell by lysis.

Most identified cystoviruses infect Pseudomonas species, but this is likely biased due to the method of screening and enrichment. There are many proposed members of this family. Pseudomonas viruses φ7, φ8, φ9, φ10, φ11, φ12, and φ13 have been identified and named, but other cystovirus-like viruses have also been isolated. These seven putative relatives are classified as either close (φ7, φ9, φ10, φ11) or distant (φ8, φ12, φ13) relatives to φ6, with the distant relatives thought to infect via the LPS rather than the pili.

However, cystoviruses do not only infect Pseudomonas. But also bacteria of the genera Streptomyces, Microvirgula, Acinetobacter, Lactococcus, Pectobacterium, and possibly other bacterial genera.

Taxonomy 

Members of the Cystoviridae appear to be most closely related to the Reoviridae, but also share homology with the Totiviridae.  In particular, the structural genes of cystoviruses are highly-similar to those used by a number of dsRNA viruses that infect eukaryotes. The genus Cystovirus has seven species:

 Pseudomonas virus phi6
 Pseudomonas virus phi8
 Pseudomonas virus phi12
 Pseudomonas virus phi13
 Pseudomonas virus phi2954
 Pseudomonas virus phiNN
 Pseudomonas virus phiYY

Other unassigned phages:
 Microvirgula virus phiNY
 Streptomyces virus phi0
 Lactococcus virus phi7-4
 Pectobacterium virus MA14
 Acinetobacter virus CAP3
 Acinetobacter virus CAP4
 Acinetobacter virus CAP5
 Acinetobacter virus CAP6
 Acinetobacter virus CAP7

References

External links
 ICTV Online Report: Cystoviridae
 Viralzone: Cystovirus

Cystoviridae
Riboviria
Virus genera